Khatangsky District  was a former district (raion) of the former Taymyr (Dolgan-Nenets) Autonomous Okrug, Russia which was merged into Krasnoyarsk Krai on 1 January 2007. The administrative centre of the district was the town of Khatanga.

Khatangsky district was located in the east of the Taymyr Dolgan-Nenets AO. It encompassed the south-eastern part of the Taymyr Peninsula and the majority of the Khatanga River was in the district.

History 

Khatangsky district was created on 10 February 1927, before Taymyr AO was created. In 1930, when the okrug was formed, Khatangsky district became immediately subordinated to it.

Upon the merger of Taymyr AO and Krasnoyarsk Krai on 1 January 2007, Khatangsky district was abolished.

Demographics

Settlements 

The district contained 10 settlements, 1 of which is nearly abandoned (postal codes in brackets):

 The town of Khatanga (647460) - population 2,524
 The village of Syndassko (647472) - population 570
 The village of Novorybnaya (647471) - population 526
 The village of Kheta (647484) - population 354
 The village of Popigai (647474) - population 319
 The village of Katyryk (647483) - population 317
 The village of Kresty (647475) - population 308
 The village of Novaya (647485) - population 294
 The village of Zhdanikha (647470) - population 204

 The village of Kayak (647486) - population said to be 4, but may be abandoned

Population 

The population of the town and 10 settlements of the former district (since 1939) were:

 1939: 3,115
 1959: 5,008
 1970: 7,471
 1979: 8,290
 1989: 10,251
 2002: 6,980
 2010: 6,081

References 

Taymyr Autonomous Okrug